Smith v Jones is a 1999 judgment of the Supreme Court of Canada, and was decided on appeal from the court of appeal for British Columbia. The Appellant sought to keep secret the professional opinion of the Respondent, a psychologist, whom the former had retained as part of his trial for aggravated assault of a prostitute. The Respondent had sought to publish his opinion of the Appellant's psychology, because he felt that the Appellant posed a danger to society.

The Respondent sought to recover his costs, but the majority rejected him, saying that the Appellant had reason to believe that the solicitor-client privilege would prevail absent a court judgment to the contrary.

The 1976 SCOTUS decision Tarasoff v. Regents of the University of California figured substantially in the SCC ruling.

References

Supreme Court of Canada cases
1999 in Canadian case law